Dominic Bozzelli (born May 22, 1991) is an American professional golfer.

Bozzelli was born in Rochester, New York. He played college golf at Auburn University after transferring from University of Central Florida. At Auburn, he won three events. He also won the Eastern Amateur and the New York State Amateur twice.

Bozzelli turned professional in 2013 and played on the NGA Pro Golf Tour in 2014, winning four times (including three straight), and earning NGA Player of the Year and Rookie of the Year honors. He also played five Web.com Tour events in 2014, finishing in the top-10 twice. He gained his 2015 Web.com Tour card through qualifying school and picked up his first Tour win in June 2016 at the Corales Puntacana Resort and Club Championship.

Amateur wins
2010 Eastern Amateur
2011 New York State Amateur, U.S. Collegiate Championship
2012 SunTrust Gator Invitational, New York State Amateur
2013 The Amer Ari Invitational
Source:

Professional wins (5)

Web.com Tour wins (1)

Web.com Tour playoff record (0–1)

Other wins (4)
2014 Spring Hill Classic, NGA Tour Classic, Lake County Classic, Southern Ontario Open (all NGA Pro Golf Tour)

See also
2016 Web.com Tour Finals graduates

References

External links

American male golfers
Auburn Tigers men's golfers
PGA Tour golfers
Korn Ferry Tour graduates
Golfers from New York (state)
University of Central Florida alumni
Sportspeople from Rochester, New York
1991 births
Living people